Matthias E. Greene was an American politician and a Republican member of the Wyoming House of Representatives representing District 45 from January 11, 2011, to January 5, 2015.

Education
Greene earned his BS from Spring Hill College and earned a law degree from the University of Wyoming.

Elections
2012 Greene was unopposed for the August 21, 2012 Republican Primary, winning with 416 votes, and won the November 6, 2012 General election by 75 votes with 1,781 votes (48.8%) against Democratic nominee Tony Mendoza.
2010 Challenging incumbent Democratic Representative Seth Carson for the District 45 seat, Greene was unopposed for the August 17, 2010 Republican Primary, winning with 520 votes, and won the November 2, 2010 General election with 1,383 votes (54.0%) against Carson.

References

External links
Official page at the Wyoming Legislature
 

Place of birth missing (living people)
Year of birth missing (living people)
Living people
Republican Party members of the Wyoming House of Representatives
National Guard (United States) officers
Politicians from Laramie, Wyoming
Spring Hill College alumni
University of Wyoming alumni